The Office of Inspectors General of the Ministry of Defence of the Russian Federation ( is a constituent part of the Russian Ministry of Defence.

Created in 2008, it numbers around thirty retired senior members of the Russian Armed Forces, usually those with the ranks of marshals of the Soviet Union, generals of the army, admirals of the fleet, marshals of artillery, marshals of aviation, and colonel generals. The membership changes as members die, and new members are appointed. Though members remain retired from the military during their service, they receive a salary.

The original members were presented with their credentials by Deputy Defence Minister  at an official ceremony at the Central House of Officers of the Russian Army on 30 December 2008.

Current members

Former members

References

Ministry of Defence (Russia)
Lists of Russian and Soviet military personnel